On 22 June 1944, the Soviet Armed Forces launched a massive attack against the German forces based in Byelorussia, which were made up of two strategic Wehrmacht army groups known as Army Group Centre. By mid July, Army Group Centre had lost no fewer than 250,000 men in less than a month of fighting, making the German position close to hopeless.

In deciding what to do, a series of military conferences were scheduled at the Wolf's Lair headquarters in East Prussia. On 20 July, Adolf Hitler and his top military commanders entered the briefing hut of the headquarters, as the usual bombproof room, with no windows and thick walls of solid concrete, was considered "unbearably hot". In attendance was Colonel Claus von Stauffenberg, who had been severely wounded in 1943 in Tunisia, losing his left eye, right hand and half of his left hand. Undetected by Hitler's ring of bodyguards, Stauffenberg carried a British-made bomb in his briefcase. His plan was to get as close as possible to Hitler, leave the briefcase nearby, and then make an excuse to quickly leave the conference by car with his adjutant and fellow conspirator Werner von Haeften. This was part of a larger planned coup d'état led by a group of army officers who were appalled by the way Hitler was leading Germany in World War II. Everything proceeded according to plan until the bomb exploded, as Stauffenberg walked towards his car, earlier than anticipated. When the explosion tore through the hut, Stauffenberg was thoroughly convinced that no one in the room could possibly have survived. Unbeknownst to Stauffenberg, Colonel Heinz Brandt had moved the briefcase containing the bomb further away from Hitler, placing it behind a solid wooden table leg, as it was in his way. Hitler survived with only minor injuries, as did most of the others present. A stenographer was killed instantly. Three officers, including Brandt, died of their injuries.

Although strictly against security doctrines imposed at the Wolf's Lair, Stauffenberg and Haeften were allowed to pass through all three checkpoints and proceed to the airport, succeeding in getting away before clarity could be established back at the now completely demolished briefing hut. In the last hours of 20 July, Stauffenberg, Haeften, and several other plotters, were arrested and summarily condemned to death. The executions were carried out by soldiers under Major Otto Remer early on the morning of 21 July.

Following the assassination attempt Hitler came to believe that the Wehrmacht leadership could not be trusted; he launched a purge of the officer corps and also used the shock of the attack to round up all the surviving members of the old opposition in the Reichstag. At the same time, those officers who had been injured or killed by the bomb were awarded the 20 July Wound Badge and hailed as heroes. General Günther Korten, General Rudolf Schmundt, Colonel Heinz Brandt and stenographer Heinrich Berger were given a state funeral with a eulogy delivered by Hermann Göring.

Participants

Approximate positions of participants when bomb exploded

See also 
 Operation Valkyrie
 List of members of the 20 July plot

References

Sources

Printed

Online 

 
 
 

20 July plot
20 July plot
20 July plot
20 July plot
20 July plot